Bonnetmouth may refer to:

Inermiidae, a fish family collectively known as 'bonnetmouths'
Emmelichthyops atlanticus, an Atlantic Ocean fish commonly known as 'bonnetmouth'
Emmelichthys nitidus, an Indian and Pacific Ocean fish commonly known as 'redbait' but is sometimes known as 'bonnetmouth'